Zemacies immatura is an extinct species of sea snail, a marine gastropod mollusk in the family Borsoniidae.

Description

Distribution
This extinct marine species is endemic to New Zealand and was found in Paleocene strata.

References

 Finlav & Marwick, N. Z. Geol. Surv. Pal. Bull. no. 15, p. 87, pl. 12, fig. 10.
 Maxwell, P.A. (2009). Cenozoic Mollusca. pp. 232–254 in Gordon, D.P. (ed.) New Zealand inventory of biodiversity. Volume one. Kingdom Animalia: Radiata, Lophotrochozoa, Deuterostomia. Canterbury University Press, Christchurch.

immatura
Gastropods of New Zealand
Gastropods described in 1937